Ras al-Ayn is a city in northeastern Syria.

Ras al-Ayn or variants (Arabic for 'Head of the Eye') may also refer to:

Places

Israel
 Ras al-Ein, Israel, a village in northern Israel, Galilee
 Antipatris, an ancient city built by the Roman Empire, at some point known as Ras al-Ayn, a Palestinian Arab village depopulated in the 1920s
 Ras al-Ein, the Arabic name for Rosh HaAyin

Jordan
 Ras El Ain, a district in Amman

Lebanon
 Ras al-Ain, Lebanon, 6 km. south of Tyre (in the Tyre District, Batouliyat Governorate) and the main source of water to the people of Tyre since Phoenician days.

Morocco
Ras El Ain, Morocco, a town

Syria
 Ras al-Ayn, Qatana, a village in the Qatana District
 Ras al-Ayn Qibli, a village in the Aleppo Governorate
 Ras al-Ayn, Rif Dimashq Governorate, a village in Rif Dimashq Governorate
 Ras al-Ayn in  al-Hasakah Governorate
 Ras al-Ayn, now Kharsan, in Hama Governorate